Hyper Battle is a 1981 board game published by Future and Fantasy Games.

Gameplay
Hyper Battle is a tactical space game involving a war between Earth the Alpha Centauri colony.

Reception
W. G. Armintrout reviewed Hyper Battle in The Space Gamer No. 45. Armintrout commented that "Hyper Battle is a bizarre space combat game. It may be challenging, but the challenge lies in memorizing the CRT and deciphering the rationale behind the game. I'd rather stick with science fiction."

References

Board games introduced in 1981